Ophélie-Cyrielle Étienne (born 9 September 1990) is a French swimmer from Wissembourg. In the 2012 Summer Olympics her 4 × 200 m freestyle team won a bronze medal in a time of 7:47.49. The split times were: Camille Muffat (1:55.51); Charlotte Bonnet (1:57.78); Étienne (1:58.05); Coralie Balmy (1:56.15).

She also competed in 200 m freestyle, 4 x 200 m freestyle relay and the 4 x 100 m freestyle relay at the 2008 Summer Olympics, and the 200 m freestyle at the 2012 Summer Olympics.

References 

 

1990 births
Living people
People from Wissembourg
Swimmers at the 2008 Summer Olympics
Swimmers at the 2012 Summer Olympics
French female freestyle swimmers
Olympic swimmers of France
Olympic bronze medalists for France
Olympic bronze medalists in swimming
Medalists at the FINA World Swimming Championships (25 m)
European Aquatics Championships medalists in swimming
Medalists at the 2012 Summer Olympics
Knights of the Ordre national du Mérite
Mediterranean Games silver medalists for France
Mediterranean Games bronze medalists for France
Swimmers at the 2009 Mediterranean Games
Mediterranean Games medalists in swimming
Sportspeople from Bas-Rhin
21st-century French women